Beam Me Up! is the eighteenth and final album by Daniel Johnston released in 2010.

Track listing
All songs written by Daniel Johnston.

"Sarah Drove Around In Her Car"
"Syrup Of Tears"
"Must"
"True Love Will Find You In The End"
"Wicked World"
"Mask"
"Try To Love"
"Devil Town"
"Love Enchanted"
"Walking the Cow"
"Last Song"
"The Beatles"

References 

2010 albums
Daniel Johnston albums